The Megiddo Junction bus bombing was the suicide bombing of  an Egged bus at  Megiddo Junction in northern Israel on June 5, 2002. 17 people were killed and 43 wounded, the majority of them IDF soldiers.

The Palestinian Islamist militant organization Islamic Jihad claimed responsibility for the attack.

The attack
On Wednesday, 5 June 2002, a Palestinian suicide bomber drove a Renault van loaded with dozens of kilograms of explosives to Highway 65. At Megiddo Junction, he approached Egged bus no. 830, filled with passengers, traveling from Tel Aviv to Tiberias. At 7:15 am, the bomber detonated the explosive device near the fuel tank of the bus, causing it to burst into flames. According to a member of the rescue crew, people were thrown out of the bus by the force of the bomb and rescuers could not board the vehicle immediately due to the extreme heat.

The blast killed 13 Israeli soldiers and four civilians. 43 passengers were injured, most of them soldiers.

Perpetrators and retaliation 
After the attack the Palestinian Islamist terror organization Islamic Jihad claimed responsibility for the attack and stated that the attack was carried out by an 18-year-old Palestinian named Hamza Samudi who originated from Jenin and had taken driving lessons four days before the attack, especially for this mission. In response, Israeli forces put Yasser Arafat under siege in his Ramallah compound once again.

References

External links
 Suicide bombing at Megiddo junction - 5-Jun-2002 - published at the Israeli Ministry of Foreign Affairs
 Israel bus attack kills 17 - BBC News, June 5, 2002
 Bomb Kills 17 Israeli Bus Passengers - Fox News, June 5, 2002
 Israel enters Jenin after suicide blast - BBC News June 5, 2002
 The Armageddon bomb - The Economist June 5, 2002

Attacks on buses by Palestinian militant groups
Palestinian suicide bomber attacks against buses
Suicide car and truck bombings in Israel
June 2002 events in Asia